Ravil Nachaev (also Ravil Nagayev, ; born June 17, 1974 in Tashkent) is an Uzbek former swimmer, who specialized in sprint freestyle and butterfly events. He is a three-time Olympian (1996, 2000, and 2004), and a gold medalist in the 50 m freestyle at the 2002 Asian Games in Busan, South Korea.

Nachaev made his official debut, as a 22-year-old, at the 1996 Summer Olympics in Atlanta. He failed to reach the top 16 final in any of his individual events, finishing forty-fifth in the 50 m freestyle (23.12), and forty-eighth in the 100 m butterfly (56.61). He also placed seventeenth, as a member of the Uzbekistan team, in the 4×100 m freestyle relay (3:28.33).

At the 2000 Summer Olympics in Sydney, Nachaev competed as a member of the Uzbekistan team in the 4×100 m freestyle relay, along with Oleg Tsvetkovskiy, Petr Vasiliev, and Oleg Pukhnatiy. Although he swam the anchor leg in heat one, his team had been disqualified due to an early relay takeoff by Pukhnatiy. On the sixth day of the Games, Nachaev swam his two individual events, with only 90 minutes in between. First, he  posted a lifetime best of 23.12 to lead the fifth heat of the 50 m freestyle. More than an hour later, in the 100 m butterfly, Nachaev stormed the entire field to another triumph in heat three by 0.04 seconds, with a time of 55.21. Despite winning the heats in just a single day, he failed to advance into the semifinals in any of his individual events, finishing thirtieth in the 50 m freestyle, and thirty-fourth in the 100 m butterfly.

Nachaev later emerged as Uzbekistan's top swimmer, when he shared the gold with South Korea's Kim Min-suk in the 50 m freestyle, a matching time of 22.86 seconds, at the 2002 Asian Games in Busan.

Nachaev shortened his program at the 2004 Summer Olympics in Athens, when he swam only for the third time in the 50 m freestyle. He achieved a FINA B-standard of 23.49 from the Kazakhstan Open Championships in Almaty. Nachaev registered a time of 23.23 to lead the fifth heat again, since he had previously done before in Sydney four years earlier. Nachaev failed to reach the semifinals for his third and final Olympic stint, placing thirty-sixth in the preliminaries.

References

External links
NBC 2008 Olympics profile

1974 births
Living people
Uzbekistani male butterfly swimmers
Olympic swimmers of Uzbekistan
Swimmers at the 1996 Summer Olympics
Swimmers at the 2000 Summer Olympics
Swimmers at the 2004 Summer Olympics
Swimmers at the 1998 Asian Games
Swimmers at the 2002 Asian Games
Swimmers at the 2006 Asian Games
Asian Games medalists in swimming
Uzbekistani male freestyle swimmers
Sportspeople from Tashkent
Asian Games gold medalists for Uzbekistan
Medalists at the 2002 Asian Games